Rimma Luchshenko (born 29 April 1993) was a road cyclist from Kazakhstan. 

She participated at the 2012 UCI Road World Championships.

References

External links
 profile at Procyclingstats.com
 http://www.cyclingnews.com/races/asian-cycling-championships-cc/junior-womens-road-race/results/
 http://www.cyclingnews.com/races/asian-cycling-championships-2012-cc/elite-women-under-23-men-road-race/results/
 http://www.roadcycling.com/news-results/uci-road-world-championships-results-elite-women-road-race#.WLnem1XyvIU

1993 births
Kazakhstani female cyclists
Living people
Place of birth missing (living people)
Cyclists at the 2010 Summer Youth Olympics
20th-century Kazakhstani women
21st-century Kazakhstani women